The year 2000 was the 219th year of the Rattanakosin Kingdom of Thailand. It was the 55th year in the reign of King Bhumibol Adulyadej (Rama IX), and is reckoned as year 2543 in the Buddhist Era.

Incumbents
King: Bhumibol Adulyadej
Crown Prince: Vajiralongkorn
Prime Minister: Chuan Leekpai
Supreme Patriarch: Nyanasamvara Suvaddhana

Event

Births

Deaths

References

 
Years of the 20th century in Thailand
Thailand
Thailand
2000s in Thailand